Javier Pérez may refer to:

 Javier Pérez de Cuéllar (1920–2020), Peruvian politician
 Javier Perez-Capdevila (born 1963), Cuban scientist
 Javier Pérez (baseball) (1902–?), Cuban baseball player
 Javier Pérez (basketball) (born 1970), Spanish basketball player
 Javier Pérez-Ramírez (born 1974), Spanish chemistry professor
 Javier Pérez (soccer coach) (born 1977), Spanish soccer coach
 Xavi Pérez (born 1984), Spanish football defender
 Javi Pérez (footballer, born 1986), Spanish football midfielder
 Javi Pérez (footballer, born 1995), Spanish football midfielder
 Javi Pérez (footballer, born 1996), Spanish football midfielder
 Javier Pérez (taekwondo) (born 1996), Spanish taekwondo athlete
 Javier Perez-Tenessa, Mexican entrepreneur